Par-A-Dice Hotel and Casino is a casino located on the Illinois River off Illinois Route 116/U.S. Route 150 in East Peoria, Illinois, United States.

The Par-A-Dice opened in 1991 in Peoria, Illinois, and moved across the river to East Peoria in 1993.  Originally established with local investors, it was later sold to Boyd Gaming.

The Par-A-Dice had cruised the Illinois River 10 times daily during its early years, but stopped cruising altogether after Illinois dropped the requirement for riverboat casinos to leave their docks in June 1999.  However, as the result of a new U.S. Coast Guard annual requirement, the riverboat set off for a few hours in the morning in June 2010 for the first time in 11 years.

References

External links
Par-A-Dice Hotel & Casino — official website
Slot777 Official-Official Play

1997 ships
Boyd Gaming
Casinos in Illinois
Hotels in Illinois
East Peoria, Illinois
Illinois River
Riverboat casinos
Buildings and structures in Tazewell County, Illinois
Tourist attractions in Tazewell County, Illinois
Casino hotels
1991 establishments in Illinois